Arlanda Central Station or Arlanda C is a railway station on the Arlanda Line serving Stockholm-Arlanda Airport in Sweden. It is served by regional, intercity, and night trains operated by SJ, and since December 2012 also by Stockholm commuter rail. Upptåget, which used to operate a commuter service between Upplands Väsby and Uppsala via Arlanda C, now only runs a few morning and night trains on weekends.

History
Plans for a railway line from the city center of Stockholm to the airport started in the early 1990s. Policy-makers wanted to allow the airport to grow without increasing the road traffic to the airport, and decided to build a railway. The project involved building a branch from the existing East Coast Line from Rosersberg and back at Odensala. Financing was secured by introducing Sweden's first public–private partnership, whereby a private consortium would be granted a 40-year permit to operate the line in exchange for all direct traffic and the right to collect usage fees from other train companies. The contract was won by A-Train in 1994, which started construction in 1995 and completed the line and station in 1999, with Arlanda C itself opening in 2000 on the East Coast Line shortly after the opening of Arlanda North and Arlanda South stations.

From 2006 to 2012, Upptåget operated a commuter train service every 30 minutes between Upplands Väsby and Uppsala via Arlanda C. At Upplands Väsby, passengers could transfer to Stockholm commuter rail. When Stockholm commuter rail started its service from Älvsjö (Tumba) to Uppsala C, Upptåget ended its commuter service, except for a few morning and night trains on weekends.

Facilities

Arlanda C is one of three train stations at Arlanda, the other two being Arlanda North Station and Arlanda South Station, both which are exclusively served by the Arlanda Express.

Services
The station is served by 70 daily regional and long-distance trains operated by SJ.

SJ operates northbound fast trains from Stockholm to Östersund, Sundsvall and Umeå.

Since 9 December 2012, Stockholm commuter rail trains stop at Arlanda C every 30 minutes (60 minutes on weekend mornings and nights). It takes 36 minutes from Arlanda C to Stockholm City station, and 18 minutes to Uppsala C.

References

External links 
 

Arlanda Line
Railway stations opened in 1999
Railway stations located underground in Stockholm County
Airport railway stations in Sweden
1999 establishments in Sweden